The Shohada mosque is a historical mosque at city center of Tabriz, Iran. It is dedicated to the martyrs of Islam.

References

Buildings of the Qajar period
Mosques in Tabriz
Mosque buildings with domes
National works of Iran